Copelatus chipiriricus is a species of diving beetle. It is part of the genus Copelatus in the subfamily Copelatinae of the family Dytiscidae. It was described by Guignot in 1957.

References

chipiriricus
Beetles described in 1957